The men's quadruple sculls competition at the 2016 Summer Olympics in Rio de Janeiro was held from 6 to 11 August at the Lagoon Rodrigo de Freitas.

The medals for the competition were presented by James Tomkins, Australia, member of the International Olympic Committee, and the gifts were presented by Patrick Rombaut, Belgium, Member of the Executive Committee of the International Rowing Federation.

Results

Heats
First two of each heat qualify to Final A, remainder goes to the repechage.

Heat 1

Heat 2

Repechage
First two of heat qualify to Final A, remainder goes to the Final B.

Finals

Final B

Final A

References

Men's quadruple sculls
Men's events at the 2016 Summer Olympics